Alders and Aalders are Dutch patronymic surname, meaning "son of Aldert/Aaldert", a Dutch version of the name Adelard. People with that name include:

People

Alders 
  (1946–2010), Dutch author
 Hans Alders (born 1950), Dutch politician
 Jacky Alders (born 1956), Belgian sprint canoer who competed in the 1976 Summer Olympics
 Jay Alders (born 1973), American fine artist, photographer and graphic designer
 Joey Alders (born 1999), Dutch racing driver
 Robyn Alders (born ca. 1960), Australian veterinary scientist

Aalders 
  (1870–1945), Dutch theologian

See also 
 Alder (disambiguation)
 Alder (surname)
 Alda (name)
 Allder (disambiguation)

References 

Dutch-language surnames
Patronymic surnames